The Hotline is a 1974 Australian TV film about a newspaperman who starts writing an advice column.

References

External links

Australian television films
1974 television films
1974 films
1970s English-language films
1970s Australian films